Bosudong Cooler(Korean: 보수동쿨러) is an Indie Rock/Folk Rock band hailing from the seaside city of Busan, South Korea.
Its members are Minji Kim (guitar, vocals), Seulhan Goo (guitar, backing vocals), Sangwon Lee (bass), and Woongyu choi (drums).

The group formed in 2017 and has released one full-length album, Sand (2021), and three singles: Kill me (2018), Cotton (2018) and We Live in the Jurassic Park (2020) and one extended plays: Yeah, I don't want it (2019).

Bosudong Cooler nominated for Best Modern Rock Album at the 2021 Korean Music Awards.

The band released a collaboration EP Love Sand (2022) with their fellow band Hathaw9y.

Band members
Current members
 Minji Kim – vocals, guitar (2020–present)
 Seulhan Goo – guitar, backing vocals (2017–present)
 Sangwon Lee – bass guitar (2019–present)
 Woongyu Choi – drums (2017–present)

Former members
 Juri Jung – vocals, guitar (2017–2020)
 Yanggang Lee – bass guitar (2017–2018)

Discography

Albums

Extended plays

Singles

Music videos 
 Kill me(2018)
 Cotton(2018)
 0308 (2019)
 We live in the Jurassic Park(2020)
 Sand(2021)
 O Rang Dae(2021)

Awards and nominations

References

External links 
 Bosudong Cooler on Bandcamp
 Bosudong Cooler official website on notion
 Bosudong Cooler on YouTube

South Korean indie rock groups
South Korean rock music groups
Musical groups established in 2017
Musical groups from Busan